Jankovice is a municipality and village in Pardubice District in the Pardubice Region of the Czech Republic. It has about 300 inhabitants.

Administrative parts
Villages of Kozašice and Seník are administrative parts of Jankovice.

References

Villages in Pardubice District